The 2016 Campeonato Sul-Mato-Grossense was the 38th season of Mato Grosso do Sul's top professional football league. The competition began on January 31 and ends in May.

Format
First Stage: double round-robin, in which all teams are split into two groups off six and they play each other home-and-away games.
Second Stage: the top four teams from each group will advance to play-offs stage.

The winner of second stage is crowned the champion.

The two teams last placed in the first stage are relegated to Campeonato Sul-Mato Grossense (lower levels).

Participating Teams

First stage

Group A

Group B

References

Campeonato Sul-Mato-Grossense
Sul-Mato-Grossense